The National Budget of South Africa comprises the spending and revenues of the Government of South Africa. The budget is the financial representation of the priorities of the government, reflecting historical economic decisions and competing economic policy's.

Budget Summary

Detailed National Budget

Expected Revenue

Economic Development

Peace And Security

General Public Services

Learning And Culture

Health

Community Development

Social Development

Debt Service

Detailed Provincial Budget

Eastern Cape

Free State

Gauteng

KwaZulu-Natal

Limpopo

Mpumalanga

North West

Northern Cape

Western Cape 
In 2021/22 the Western Cape Provincial government received a total budget of just under R 72.35 billion with 74% (R54.445 billion) of that in the form of "equitable shares" from the national government budget, 18% (R13.53 billion) in the form of "conditional grants" from national government, 4% in "financing", 3% from the provinces own receipts, and 1% from the provincial revenue fund in the form of tax receipts. In 2019 the 17.1% of all South African taxpayers were located in the Western Cape; the province contributed 16.9% of the country's total taxable income thereby contributing to just under R 269.58 billion to the fiscus. 

Below is a breakdown of the Western Cape governments 2021/22 budget.

See also 
 Economy Of South Africa
 Government of South Africa
 Provincial Budget of Eastern Cape
 Provincial Budget of Free State
 Provincial Budget of Gauteng
 Provincial Budget of KwaZulu-Natal
 Provincial Budget of Limpopo
 Provincial Budget of Mpumalanga
 Provincial Budget of North West
 Provincial Budget of Northern Cape
 Provincial Budget of Western Cape

References 

Economy of South Africa
South African Budgets